AfterShock Comics is an American comic book publisher founded in April 2015. AfterShock is described as a "hybrid comic book company combining the creative edge of an independent comic book publisher with the strengths and experience of a traditional powerhouse." Senior executives include Jawad Qureshi. In December 2022, AfterShock Comics filed for Chapter 11 bankruptcy.

History
The company was co-founded by Joe Pruett, editor of the noted comic anthology Negative Burn and Mike Marts, the former executive editor in charge of Marvel Comics' X-Men franchise and DC Comics' Batman franchise. Other co-founders include Lee Kramer, Jon Kramer, and Michael Richter. Other senior executives include Jawad Qureshi.

AfterShock's published works are creator-owned and its portfolio includes comics by Cullen Bunn, Warren Ellis, Garth Ennis, and Marguerite Bennett, among others.

AfterShock Comics won the New Publisher of the Year Diamond Gem Award in 2017.

The label attracted attention in 2016 when it published Paul Jenkins' comic Alters, featuring the character Chalice, touted as the first transgender superhero. In a column for The Mary Sue, transgender activist Jes Grobman dismissed Alters as "cliche". Other critics were more positive; one noted that "[t]he visuals are beautiful and deserve attention, while the story looks to be addressing something avoided in American society."

Creators

Adam Glass
Patrick Olliffe
Brian Azzarello
Paul Jenkins
Tim Seeley
Cullen Bunn
Mark Waid
John Layman
Sam Kieth
Frank Tieri
Amanda Conner
Jimmy Palmiotti

See also
 List of Aftershock Comics publications

References

External links
 
 

 
American companies established in 2015
Comic book publishing companies of the United States
Companies based in Los Angeles
Companies that filed for Chapter 11 bankruptcy in 2022
Publishing companies based in California
Publishing companies established in 2015